Krishna Kaur Khalsa is an American teacher of Kundalini Yoga as taught by Yogi Bhajan.  Born Thelma Oliver, she pursued a career in films and theater before in 1970 dedicating herself to empowering others through the practice of yoga.

Early years
Khalsa was born Thelma Oliver in Los Angeles, California on May 6, 1939.  Her father, Cappy Oliver, played trumpet with Lionel Hampton's band and her mother tried her hand at roller skating, wrestling, and singing before settling down to raise five children.  She studied dance at a school run by Jeni Le Gon before majoring in Drama and Theatre Arts at the University of California in Los Angeles UCLA.

Performing career
Oliver dropped out of school in 1961 and went East to pursue her calling as a performer.  Her off-Broadway stage debut was in The Blacks by French dramatist Jean Genet, where she performed the role of Virtue along with Louis Gossett Jr.  Oliver also performed in the musicals Fly Blackbird and Cindy, and the revue The Living Premise, where in 1963 she replaced Diana Sands for two months.

Oliver also took a number of film roles beginning with a part as a "Negro woman" in the hit South Pacific.  Her contribution to the 1961 swashbuckler Pirates of Tortuga is not credited.  In Black Like Me, released in 1964, Oliver played the role of Georgie.  She performed the role of "Ortiz's girl" in Sidney Lumet's The Pawnbroker.  The cast included Rod Steiger, Geraldine Fitzgerald, Brock Peters, and Morgan Freeman. It was Oliver's pivotal scene with Rod Steiger near the film's end, that drew controversy at the time, when Oliver exposed her breasts. The film was among the first American movies to feature nudity during the Production Code, and was the first film featuring bare breasts to receive Production Code approval. Although it was publicly announced to be a special exception, the controversy proved to be first of similar major challenges to the Code that ultimately led to its abandonment.

Thelma Oliver's biggest success as a performer came when she landed the role of "Helene" in the Broadway musical Sweet Charity with Gwen Verdon.  Sweet Charity played at the Palace Theatre (New York City) from January 1966 to July 1967, 608 performances, garnering twelve Tony Award nominations, including an award for its choreography.

Turn to Yoga
While a 1966 Ebony Magazine profile mentions Oliver's study of "yoga philosophy and breathing,"  yoga became her life's calling four years later when she met Yogi Bhajan.  Yogi Bhajan renamed her "Krishna Kaur" - meaning Divine Princess.  Under his direction, she became a yoga teacher with a special dispensation to serve the Black community.  Krishna Kaur established a yoga community in the Watts, Los Angeles neighborhood with a live-in center, children's school, day care, twice weekly free kitchen and "Sat Nam Street Players" dedicated to bringing music and inspiration to the troubled streets of the ghetto.

Krishna Kaur's radical spirit found full expression in her yoga mission.  In her words: "The revolution is really one of the mind.  Blacks have got to realize where the power really is.  The struggle is not on a physical level.  It is on the level of the mind."

Krishna Kaur's journey into Kundalini Yoga and the Sikh tradition of Yogi Bhajan took her to the spiritual capital of Amritsar and the "Golden Temple" or Harimandir Sahib in December 1970 and again thereafter.  In August 1980 she made history when, through a combination of circumstances she became the first and only woman to have ever sung Sikh hymns within the strictly patriarchal precincts of the Golden Temple.

In the 1990s, Krishna Kaur played a central role in the founding of the International Black Yoga Teachers Association.  She also started up Yoga for Youth, dedicated to serving young people in trouble with the U.S. criminal justice system.  Krishna Kaur is currently the Chairman of the Board of Yoga for Youth.

Known for her musical talent, Krishna Kaur never gave up performing.  In the 1970s, she toured and recorded with a group called "Sat Nam West." In 2014, she released an album, One Creator.

Websites
 http://www.krishnakaur.org
 http://www.yogaforyouth.org

References

1941 births
American yoga teachers
Living people
American actresses
21st-century American women